The Council of the Royal County of Berkshire, also known as the Berkshire County Council, was the top-tier local government administrative body for Berkshire from 1889 to 1998. The local authority had responsibilities for education, social services, public transport, planning, emergency services and waste disposal, and had 87 members. Berkshire County Council shared power with six lower-tier district councils, each of which directed local matters.

On 1 April 1998, under the provisions of the Local Government Act 1992, it was abolished and replaced by its six former districts, the unitary authorities of West Berkshire, Windsor and Maidenhead, Wokingham, Bracknell Forest, Reading and Slough.

History

Creation

The Local Government Act 1888 created County Councils to replace the Court of Quarter Sessions and elections in 1888 brought about the county council's launch.

From A History of the first Berkshire County Council:

Berkshire County Council established its meeting place in the assize courts in Reading. Meanwhile the administrative staff and committee rooms of the County Council were accommodated in the shire hall next door. Following the Local Government Act 1972, the council found a need to move to bigger premises at Shire Hall in Shinfield Park in the winter of 1980/1981, at an estimated cost of £27.5 million.

List of chairmen

Berkshire County Council had both a council leader and the mostly ceremonial role of chairman (no women are known to have been chair during the council’s existence).

Chairmanships were unlimited in duration or number of times (e.g. Sir George Robert Mowbray held the chairmanship twice in – 1944-1946 and 1960-1965).

In 1965, Chairman Sir Louis Dickens changed the term of office to 3 years, to be changed one year before elections. In 1974, the Local Government Act changed the size of and nature of the council, hence the distinction between 'Old' and 'New' County Councils.

Old Berkshire County Council (1889-1974)

William George Mount (Chairman of the preceding Court of Quarter Sessions 1887-1889)       1889-1905 Conservative

Albert Richard Tull        1905-1906

William Hew Dunn        1906-1911

Sir Robert Gray Cornish Mowbray       1911-1916

James Herbert Benyon       1916-1926

Sir William Arthur Mount       1926-1930

Thomas Skurray         1931-1938

- Known by the famous poem:

Alderman Arthur Thomas Loyd OBE     1938-1944 Conservative

Sir George Robert Mowbray       1944-1946

Henry Arthur Benyon        1946-1947

Herbert James Thomas        1947-1954

William John Cumber        1954-1957

Colonel Granville Watson      1957-1960

Sir George Robert Mowbray (As above)      1960-1965

Air Commodore Sir Louis Walter Dickens (Instituted 3 year Chairmanships)1965-1968

Derrick Aylmer Frederick Henry Howard Hartley Russell   1968-1971

Richard Henry Carilef Seymour       1971-1974

New Berkshire County Council (1974-1998)
Frederick Derwent Pickering     1974-1977 Conservative

Lt. Col. Richard Watt      1977-1980 Conservative

Lewis David Moss                                                   1980-1982 Conservative

W.T. Timperley               1982-1983 Labour

Ian Morgan   1983-1986 Conservative

Frederick Gareth Robert Gimblett                          1986-1989 Conservative

William Anthony Wiseman (‘Tony Wiseman’)      1989-1992 Conservative

Ronald James Day      1992-1995 Liberal Democrat

C.C. Trembath          1995-1998 Liberal Democrat

Abolition and creation of the Unitary Authorities

The 1990s led to the restoration of county boroughs under a new name, "unitary authorities", which radically changed the administrative map of England. The Banham Review of 1992 sought to consolidate local authorities where possible and abolish unnecessary tiers of government. The changes to Berkshire County Council in 1998 were part of the final wave of changes resulting from the act.

The council was abolished, and the ceremonial county is now governed by the six unitary authorities: West Berkshire, Windsor and Maidenhead, Wokingham, Bracknell Forest, Reading and Slough. The general secretary of the National Association of Local Government Officers described the re-organisation as a "completely cynical manoeuvre".

Aftermath
One of the last Chairmen of Berkshire County Council, Tony Wiseman, went on to found CRAG (a combination of the Readingstoke Action Group and CPRE) with a number of other former members of the council. CRAG successfully opposed Wokingham borough council's plan for building of houses between Reading and Basingstoke (to create a conurbation dubbed Readingstoke).

After the abolition and until the 2009 local government reforms, the ceremonial county of Berkshire was unique in England as being the only non-metropolitan county to have no County Council throughout its entire area, with the entire county governed by unitary authorities.

Powers and composition

As stated above, under the Local Government Act 1972 the chief responsibilities of Berkshire County Council, in common with other non-metropolitan county authorities, included education, social services, public transport, planning, emergency services and waste disposal. It served to provide a strategic county-wide framework within which the differing plans of its six district councils could be harmonised.

As with many County Councils, the Local Government Act 1972 changed the structure of the council, and a large area around Abingdon and the Vale of the White Horse became part of Oxfordshire while Slough, which had been within Buckinghamshire, became part of Berkshire. The former County Borough of Reading - which had been part of the historic assize and ceremonial county - also became part of the administrative county.

Elections to the Berkshire County Council

Elections were held to Berkshire County Council every 3 years, with chairmen being selected in the second year of each term (in all years after 1965). After the 1974 re-organisation elections were held every four years, the last full election taking place in 1993.

Political Composition

Between 1889 and 1945, the Council was fairly apolitical, although two of the Chairmen (William George Mount and Arthur Loyd) went on to become Conservative MP's.

Following the 1945 General election, the Labour Party won 17 councillors in 1945. Despite this win, Labour were still a minority and party politics didn't really come to the fore until 1974, with the Local Government Act 1972. This Act also brought representatives of the former County Borough of Reading on to the County Council for the first time and brought the Borough of Slough into the County from Buckinghamshire while the northern part of the county was transferred to Oxfordshire.

The council was then dominated by the Conservatives, until 1990 when they lost overall control but continued to run the Council's administration.

In 1992 a Lib Dem coalition with Labour took majority control of the Council and, following the 1993 elections, dominated the council until the coalition fractured in 1996. A Lib Dem minority administration with Conservative support then ran the council until it was split into unitary authorities. The final leader of the council, from July 1996 to March 1998, was Bob Mowatt, a Liberal Democrat, although for the final couple of months his deputy, Jeff Brooks, was serving as acting leader.

Coat of arms

Owing to the reorganisation of the council under the Local Government Act 1972, the coat of arms for Berkshire County Council is different before and after 1974.

Pre 1974 (1947-1974)

Arms and Crest [the stag argent] granted 18 July 1947. Crest changed and supporters granted 7 April 1961.

The coat of arms granted by the College of Arms to the Berkshire County Council are described as:

From Civic Heraldry:

Post 1974 (1974-1998)

Again from Civic Heraldry:

And from Berkshire History:

In popular culture

 The main setting for BBC comedy show "The Wrong Mans" and the workplace for the main two characters.

Notes

External links
Civic Heraldry
Berkshire History

 
History of Berkshire
Local authorities in Berkshire
1998 disestablishments in England
1974 establishments in England
Former county councils of England